Erick Antonio Pulgar Farfán (born 15 January 1994) is a Chilean professional footballer who plays for Campeonato Brasileiro Série A club Flamengo, and the Chile national team. Mainly a defensive midfielder, he can also play as a defender.

Club career

Deportes Antofagasta
Born in Antofagasta, Pulgar started playing at age 6 for South West Miramar club. At 15, he was invited to a youth championship where the professional Carlos Carcamo approached the young player to sign for the Deportes Antofagasta youth team. At Antofagasta, Pulgar played as a winger and left back. He debuted for the senior team in 2013 after which he became a first team regular. He has been described as a tall, fast player that covers the defense very well, with a good passing game. In 2014 he was named player of the season.

Universidad Católica
On 28 June 2014, Deportes Antofagasta confirmed the transfer of Pulgar to Universidad Católica, for $400,000 US dollars for 70% of the player's rights. Pulgar signed a three-year contract.

Pulgar was the most outstanding player in a poor Universidad Católica 2014-15 season. After the arrival of manager Mario Salas, he started playing as a midfielder.

Bologna
On 20 August 2015, Italian club Bologna signed Pulgar from Universidad Católica on a four-year deal for an undisclosed fee. He was given the number 5 shirt.
On 11 January 2019, Pulgar extended his contract until 30 June 2022.

Fiorentina
On 9 August 2019, Pulgar signed for Fiorentina.

Loan to Galatasaray
On 3 February 2022, Turkish club Galatasaray announced the arrival of Pulgar on loan from Fiorentina.

Flamengo
On 29 July 2022 Flamengo signed Pulgar from Fiorentina in a €3 million transfer, he signed a contract with the Brazilian club until December 2025.

International career
At the 2019 Copa America, Pulgar scored a goal in Chile's opening match against Japan. This was his first goal for the national side.

Personal life
On 23 August 2020 he tested positive for COVID-19.

Career statistics

Club

International

International goals
As of match played 14 October 2021. Scores and results list Chile's goal tally first.

Honours

Club
Flamengo
Copa Libertadores: 2022
 Copa do Brasil: 2022

International
Chile
Copa América: 2016

References

External links
 

1994 births
Living people
People from Antofagasta
Chilean footballers
Chilean expatriate footballers
Chile international footballers
Association football midfielders
C.D. Antofagasta footballers
Club Deportivo Universidad Católica footballers
Bologna F.C. 1909 players
ACF Fiorentina players
Galatasaray S.K. footballers
CR Flamengo footballers
Chilean Primera División players
Serie A players
Süper Lig players
Campeonato Brasileiro Série A players
Chilean expatriate sportspeople in Italy
Chilean expatriate sportspeople in Turkey
Chilean expatriate sportspeople in Brazil
Expatriate footballers in Italy
Expatriate footballers in Turkey
Expatriate footballers in Brazil
Copa América Centenario players
2019 Copa América players
2021 Copa América players
Copa América-winning players
Copa Libertadores-winning players